Orozco v Attorney General (2016) 90 WIR 161, also known as Orozco v AG, the Orozco case, or the UNIBAM case, was a landmark case heard by the Supreme Court of Belize, which held that a long-standing buggery statute breached constitutional rights to dignity, equality before the law, freedom of expression, privacy, and non-discrimination on grounds of sex, and which declared the statute null and void to the applicable extent. The decision decriminalised consensual same-sex intercourse for the first time in 127 years, and established that the constitutional right to non-discrimination on grounds of sex extended to sexual orientation.

Background

Buggery statute 
Buggery is thought to have been first criminalised in colonial Belize by the Criminal Code Act 1888, brought into force on 15 December 1888, which provided that – This first statute, nonetheless, classified consensual buggery as a public nuisance, rather than an indictable offence. However, Ordinance No. 4 of 1944 removed the distinction, making both consensual and non-consensual buggery a crime. The Ordinance's wording was substantially retained in section 53 of the Criminal Code Act 1981, which provided that –

Claim preparation 
Caleb Orozco, then-president of United Belize Advocacy Movement (UNIBAM), first contemplated litigation during a conversation with two law professors of the UWI Rights Advocacy Project, while at a 2009 conference on HIV/AIDS in Jamaica. The professors hoped to lay 'the groundwork for a test case [which], if successful, could encourage similar legal challenges in neighboring [Commonwealth] countries,' and considered Belize an 'ideal' jurisdiction, as its Constitution Act 1981 'had stronger personal privacy and equality protections than other Caribbean countries.'

Facts 
Orozco 'is a Belizean national who has faced violence, persecution and discrimination since he came out to his family when he was fifteen years of age. Orozco and UNIBAM jointly filed suit against the Attorney General of Belize on 24 September 2010. The claimants sought, principally, a finding declaring section 53 of the Criminal Code Act null and void and of no effect as regards private carnal intercourse between consenting persons, in so far as it contravened constitutional rights to dignity, privacy, and equal protection under the law, as enshrined in sections 3, 6, and 14 of the Constitution Act. UNIBAM were found to lack standing in 2011, and so removed as a claimant, but admitted as an interested party for Orozco. Contemporaneously, the Commonwealth Lawyers Association, Human Dignity Trust, and International Commission of Jurists were admitted as interested parties for the claimant, while the Roman Catholic Diocese, Anglican Diocese, and Evangelical Association of Churches were admitted as interested parties for the defendant. Oral arguments were heard during 7–10 May 2013.

In support of their claim, Orozco deposed in an affidavit – 
The claimant, and their interested parties and expert witnesses, further brought to bear evidence on the role the challenged statute played in the stigma, violence, and negative health outcomes experienced by LGBT nationals.

In opposition to the claim, the defendant and their interested parties first challenged the claimant's standing, arguing that the latter had not demonstrated past, present, nor likely future prosecution under the challenged statute, as required by section 20 of the Constitution Act. The Court, however, following Dudgeon v UK and Tan Eng Hong v AG, rejected this argument, noting the claimant 'perpetually [ran] the risk of being prosecuted.' The parties next challenged the Court's authority and cogency as to the judicial review of an Act of Parliament. The Court likewise rejected this challenge, following Nadan & McCoskar v The State, further noting –

In interpreting the Constitution Act, Chief Justice Benjamin opined that '[t]he plain language of the Constitution must be given a liberal and purposive interpretation.' Furthermore, noting the Act's provenance from Universal Declaration of Human Rights via the European Convention on Human Rights, and following AG v Joseph, Boyce v R, and R v Lewis, the Chief Justice held that the Act's interpretation may or ought to be informed by the jurisprudence of international bodies. The parts of the Act which were pertinent to the claim, ie sections 3, 6, 11, 12, 14, and 16, were therefore examined in accordance with the afoementioned principles.

Judgment 
Section 53 of the Criminal Code Act was, first, held to be in breach of the claimant's right to dignity and so in violation of section 3 of the Constitution Act, here following Law v Canada and National Coalition for Gay and Lesbian Equality v Minister of Justice. Significantly, the right to privacy, conferred by section 14 of the latter Act, was held to be 'associated with' and to 'emanat[e] from the concept of human dignity.' However, section 14 exempts laws from being deemed violations of the former 'to the extent that the law in question makes reasonable provision that is required in the interests of [...] public morality[.]' The defendant and their interested parties, however, were unable to demonstrate that the buggery provision of section 53 was required in the interest of public morality, resulting in the section's being deemed non-exempt by section 14, here following Dudgeon v UK, Reyes v R, Lawrence v Texas, and O'Sullivan v MNR. Accordingly, section 53 was likewise held to be in breach of the claimant's right to privacy and so in violation of section 14. Finally, section 53 was held to be in breach of the claimant's right to equality before the law and so in violation of section 6 of the Constitution Act, and further, of section 16 of the same, here following Toonen v Australia. Significantly, in this last decision, the Court interpreted the word 'sex' in section 16 to extend to sexual orientation, following the UN Human Rights Committee interpretation of the same in Articles 2 and 26 of the International Covenant on Civil and Political Rights, to which Belize acceded subsequent to Toonen.

Consequently, the Court found in favour of the claimant as follows.
The Court further awarded the claimant 'costs fit for two Senior Counsel.'

Reactions

Acclaim 
The judgment was welcomed by local and regional LGBT organisations, as well as international human rights bodies. It has been commended by scholars for bringing Belizean law 'within the purview of international human rights.' Orozco, in particular, has been praised for placing his 'safety on the line to fight for equality.'

Criticism 
Various particular aspects of the judgment and case were criticised. The Court's finding that UNIBAM lacked standing was criticised in scholarly and lay literature. The Court's unusual delay was also criticised. The little attention paid, in the written decision, to the relationship between freedom of expression and the buggery statute has been called 'unfortunate,' given that this might 'undermine its [the judgment's] usefulness in other litigation around the Caribbean.' 

Various interested parties, and in particular, their acceptance of foreign aid or advice, were also criticised. Human Dignity Trust 'received harsh criticism in Belize because the article [announcing their involvement as an interested party in 2011] did not make it clear that the case had already been initiated by Belizean lawyers with a legal strategy developed by a local organisation [UNIBAM].' Belize Action, a religious group who opposed the decriminalisation of same-sex intercourse, denounced the involvement of overseas persons and organisations in favour of the claimant, but were themselves criticised for receiving foreign aid. Various local conservative groups similarly criticised foreign involvement in the case, calling it an instance of neocolonialism, but have likewise been criticised for accepting foreign aid, and their criticisms described as a hypocritical diversion tactic. Then-Prime Minister, Dean Barrow, seemingly concurred, stating, 'One of the things that we have to be grateful for in this country is [that] the culture wars we see in the United States have not been imported into Belize [...] this [the case] is the start of exactly such a phenomenon.'

Opposition 

The case was opposed by various local bodies and persons. For instance, the editor-in-chief of the Amandala, Russell Vellos, stated – 
On 26 November 2014, the Association of Evangelical Churches called for a national referendum on the question of whether section 53 of the Criminal Code Act should be retained, it being believed that the section would 'remain intact because a majority of the citizenry share[d] the [Association's] views that it [was] necessary to upold [the section] in order to secure the morals and values of the society, and specifically to prevent the legislation of same-sex marriage.'

Appeals 

The Attorney General, in Attorney General v Orozco, appealed the Supreme Court's judgment on sections 12 and 16. Notably, Government did not appeal the decriminalisation of same-sex intimacy, findings regarding sections 3, 6, and 14, nor the Court's exercise of judicial review. Oral arguments concluded on 29 October 2018, and judgment was delivered on 30 December 2019. The Court of Appeals upheld the lower court's findings on sections 12 and 16, and notably, reaffirmed that the term 'sex' in the Constitution Act encompasses sexual orientation, thereby becoming 'the first appellate tribunal in the Caribbean to reach these conclusions.' This judgment is considered final, as it was not appealed to the Caribbean Court of Justice within the required time.

The Roman Catholic Diocese also appealed the judgment, but on all, rather than limited, grounds.

Significance 
Orozco v AG is thought to have been the first challenge to Belize's sodomy statute since the latter's introduction in 1888, and the first instance of the judicial review of such law in the Commonwealth Caribbean. The judgment made Belize the second Commonwealth Caribbean country to decriminalise consensual same-sex intercourse, after The Bahamas. The case is considered a 'landmark,' and has been cited as a possible precedent for other former British colonies in the region.

Notes and references

Explanatory footnotes

Short citations

Full citations 

 
 
 
 
 
 
 
 
 
 
 
 
 
 
 

2016 in LGBT history
Law of Belize
LGBT rights in Belize
LGBT rights case law